Nocturne indien is a 1989 French film directed by Alain Corneau, based on the novel Notturno Indiano by Italian writer Antonio Tabucchi.

Cast and roles
 Jean-Hugues Anglade - Rossignol / Xavier
 Clémentine Célarié - Christine
 Otto Tausig - Peter Schlemihl
 T.P. Jain - the doctor
 Iftekhar - the theosophy professor
 Maniyanpilla Raju - restaurant owner

References

External links
 IMDb entry

French drama films
1989 films
Films based on Italian novels
Films directed by Alain Corneau
1980s French films